The discography of Australian hip hop group Hilltop Hoods consists of seven studio albums, six extended plays (EPs), twenty-four singles and three DVDs. Their debut studio album A Matter of Time was released independently in 1999.

Their second studio album Left Foot, Right Foot was also released independently two years later in 2001, while their first label record, their third studio album The Calling, was released via Obese Records on 22 September 2003. It became Hilltop Hoods' first charted album as it peaked at 50th on the Australian national chart. It was also certified platinum in Australia by the Australian Recording Industry Association (ARIA).

Their fourth studio album became their first number one album in Australia, titled The Hard Road. Released on 6 April 2006 via Obese Records, it was certified platinum by ARIA. The record also received a remixed version the following year, titled The Hard Road: Restrung, it placed at 8th on the Australian chart and was certified gold in the country. State of the Art, their fifth studio album, became their second number one album in the country and their first double platinum record. It was released on 12 June 2009 via Golden Era Records.

Their subsequent two albums, Drinking from the Sun (2012) and Walking Under Stars (2014), were also certified double-platinum and charted at number one in Australia. Drinking from the Sun, which is Hilltop Hood's sixth studio album, peaked in New Zealand at 37th while their seventh studio album Walking Under Stars debuted at 23rd in the country and also at 19th in Switzerland. Their sixth and seventh studio albums were modified and re-released in 2016 as Drinking from the Sun, Walking Under Stars Restrung, a remix album. It was certified platinum and charted in Australia and Switzerland at number one and fifty respectively.

Studio albums

Remix albums

Instrumental albums

Extended plays
Back Once Again – Independent (1997)
Chase That Feeling – Golden Era Records (2009)
Still Standing – Golden Era Records (2009)
The Light You Burned – Golden Era Records (2009)
The Good Life in the Sun – Golden Era Records (2012)
The Cold Night Sky – Golden Era Records (2015)

Singles

Other certified songs

Video albums

Production credits
Everyone We Know – Thundamentals (song: "21 Grams") (2017)
Seven Mirrors – Drapht (song: "Don Quixote") (2016)
Nobody's Business – Maundz (song: "Mad Nice") (2015)
Golden Era Records Mixtape 2014 – Various (song: "Posse Cut (Cypher)") (2014)
Golden Era Records Mixtape 2013 – Various (songs: "Rattling The Keys To The Kingdom (K21 Remix)", "Posse Cut") (2013)
Cinematic – Illy (song: "Coming Down") (2013)
Golden Era Mixtape 2012 – Various (songs: "I Love It (Trials Remix)", "Rattling The Keys To The Kingdom") (2012)
The Quickening – The Funkoars (song: "Bodycount") (2011)
Marked For Death – Vents (song: "Chaos") (2011)
Fear and Loathing – Hunter & Mortar (song: "Bat Country" w/ Layla and Graphic) (2011)
Golden Era Mixtape 2011 – Various (songs: "Debris Told Me", "Chase That Feeling") (2011)
Window of Time – Reason (songs: "Kosher", "Action", "Youth", "Window of Time", "I Want...", "We Come From An Era", "Dedicate", "Don't Believe") (2011)
The Blacklist – Briggs (song: "Since Forever (The Storytellers)") (2010)
Strange Journey Volume One – CunninLynguists (song: "Nothing But Strangeness") (2009)
The Hangover – The Funkoars (song: "Double Dutch") (2008)
The Tides are Turning – Reason (songs: "Cloud Surfing", "Grounded") (2008)
Batterie – Omni (song: "We Are All We Have") (2007)
Burn City – Pegz (songs: "No Attachments", "The Fight") (2007)
Hard to Kill – Vents (songs: "In the Shadows", "In the Shadows (Trials Remix)") (2007)
Day of the Dog – Bliss n Eso (song: "Watch Your Mouth") (2006)
Diggi Down Under – Mystro (songs: "Trade Secrets", "Public Herbalist Announcement", "Wizard Of Oz") (2006)
The Greatest Hits – The Funkoars (songs: "What I Want", "Meet the Family") (2006)
Axis – Pegz (song: "This Is For Life") (2005)
Who Am I – Drapht (song: "Verbally Flawless") (2005)
15.Oz Vinyl 15 Years Of Australian Hip-Hop On Vinyl – Various (song: "Back Once Again") (2004)
Flowers in the Pavement – Bliss n Eso (song: "Hip Hop Blues") (2004)
Drastik Measures – Hyjak N Torcha (song: "Heard Of Us") (2004)
Moving Heads – Train Of Thought (song: "Head For The Hills") (2004)
Who's Your Step Daddy? – The Funkoars (song: "Bad Habits") (2003)
More Than Music – Muphin (song: "Time For") (2003)
Waking the Past – Terra Firma (songs: "Shadow Society (Remix)", "The Night The Heavens Cried", "Whats Your Name", "Divine Intervention", "Sumfinwongwitme", "Trying Times", "The Good Life (Remix)", "Shadow Society") (2003)
World Domination – Cross Bred Mongrels (song: "Still Underrated") (2002)
Obesecity – Various (song: "Riding Under One Banner") (2002)
Culture of Kings Vol. 1 & 2 – Various (song: "Elevation (Live From The Jazz Lounge)") (2000)

Notes

References

Discographies of Australian artists
Hip hop discographies